Eric Stevenson (born August 30, 1990) is a retired American soccer player. He played professionally as a midfielder for New York Red Bulls in Major League Soccer and for FC Cincinnati in the United Soccer League.

Career

Youth, college, and amateur
After spending time with the Columbus Crew U-18 academy team, Stevenson committed to the University of Akron where he redshirted his freshman season.  In 2010, he made 13 appearances and finished the year with one goal and two assists and helped Akron win their first College Cup title in school history.  In 2011, he started in 14 of the 20 games he played including 12 starts at left back and finished the year with one assist.  His breakout year came in 2012 when he started all 22 games he played and tallied seven goals and five assists on his way to being named to the All-MAC Second team.  In his final season with the Zips, Stevenson made 23 appearances and finished the year with five goals and five assists.  He went on to be named First team All-MAC and First team All-Great Lakes Region in 2013.

During his time in college, Stevenson also played in the USL Premier Development League for Seattle Sounders FC U-23.

Professional

On January 16, 2014, Stevenson was drafted in the second round (34th overall) of the 2014 MLS SuperDraft by the New York Red Bulls.  Two months later, he signed a professional contract with the club. On August 26, 2014, Stevenson made his professional debut for the Red Bulls in a 2–0 win over Salvadoran club FAS in the CONCACAF Champions League.

Stevenson was waived by New York on February 13, 2015.

Stevenson signed with FC Cincinnati ahead of their inaugural 2016 season.

Honors

University of Akron
College Cup: 2010

Individual
All-MAC Second team: 2012
All-MAC First team: 2013
All-Great Lakes Region First team: 2013

References

External links

 Eric Stevenson's biography at FC Cincinnati
 
 

1990 births
Living people
American soccer players
Akron Zips men's soccer players
Seattle Sounders FC U-23 players
New York Red Bulls players
FC Cincinnati (2016–18) players
Association football midfielders
Soccer players from Columbus, Ohio
New York Red Bulls draft picks
USL League Two players
Major League Soccer players
USL Championship players